Moses Lake is a lake located near Texas City, Texas, US, in the Houston-Sugar Land-Baytown metropolitan area. It is fed by Moses Bayou and drains into Galveston Bay.

References
  Texas State Historical Association

Notes

Bodies of water of Galveston County, Texas
Geography of Houston
Greater Houston
Galveston Bay Area
Lakes of Texas